Matti Keinonen (6 November 1941 – 27 November 2021) was a Finnish professional ice hockey player and coach. During his career he played in the SM-sarja with Lukko Rauma, RU-38, HJK Helsinki, Jokerit, and TPS Turku. He was inducted into the Finnish Hockey Hall of Fame in 1987 and into the IIHF Hall of Fame in 2002. Keinonen was nicknamed as "Mölli".

He died in Uusikaupunki on 27 November 2021, at the age of 80.

Honours and accolades
Five-time SM-sarja All-Star.
Finnish Championship winner in 1962–63 with Lukko and in 1966–67 with RU-38. 
Finnish Championship Runner-up in 1960–61 with Lukko and in 1971–72 with HJK.
Finnish Championship Bronze in 1964–65 and 1968–69 with Lukko.
SM-sarja Most Goals (26) and Most Points (43) in same season (1966-1967).
Number retired by Lukko (#7).
Played with the Finnish national team at two Winter Olympic Games (1968 and 1972) and at nine World Championships (1962, 1963, 1965, 1966, 1967, 1969, 1970, 1972, and 1973).
Inducted to the Hockey Hall of Fame Finland in 1987 as Suomen Jääkiekkoleijona #50.
Inducted into the IIHF Hall of Fame in 2002.

References

External links

Finnish Hockey Hall of Fame page

1941 births
2021 deaths
Finnish ice hockey left wingers
HC TPS players
Jokerit players
Lukko players
Olympic ice hockey players of Finland
Ice hockey players at the 1968 Winter Olympics
Ice hockey players at the 1972 Winter Olympics
IIHF Hall of Fame inductees
Ice hockey players with retired numbers
Ice hockey people from Tampere
Ässät coaches